Sovetskaya Rossiya (Soviet Russia) is a political newspaper in Russia. It kept its name after the dissolution of the Soviet Union in December 1991 and presently presents itself as a leftist independent newspaper. Its current editor is MP Valentin Chikin.

History 
Sovetskaya Rossiya was first published on July 1, 1956. On January 1, 1974 it became the official press organ of the Supreme Soviet and Council of Ministers of the Russian SFSR. The newspaper was published six times a week; in 1975, its circulation was 2,700,000 copies.  In 2007, the circulation was 300 000, the newspaper is published three times a week.

Political tendency 
The newspaper has friendly ties with the Communist Party. During the time of the Soviet Union, Sovetskaya Rossiya was known for its opposition to Mikhail Gorbachev and support for neo-Stalinism. Notably, it published "A Word to the People", a letter signed by, among others, three of the Gang of Eight who participated in the August Coup against others. It also published "I Cannot Forsake My Principles", an infamous Stalinist critique of Gorbachev.

Rossiya Tournament 
The newspaper arranged the Rossiya Tournament, an international bandy competition held every other year in Russia in 1972–1990. This tournament lived on for another two decades, but from 1992 it was called the Russian Government Cup and was arranged by the Russian government instead.

References

External links

 

1956 establishments in the Soviet Union
Central Committee of the Communist Party of the Soviet Union 
Communist newspapers
Communist Party of the Russian Federation
Newspapers published in the Soviet Union
Publications established in 1956
Russian-language newspapers published in Russia

Recipients of the Order of the Red Banner of Labour